Incilius spiculatus (common name: spiculate toad) is a species of toad in the family Bufonidae. It is endemic to Oaxaca, Mexico, and known from the northern slopes of the Sierra de Juárez and the adjacent Sierra Mixe.
Its natural habitats are cloud forests and lowland rainforests. It breeds in streams. It is threatened by habitat loss.

References

spiculatus
Endemic amphibians of Mexico
Fauna of the Sierra Madre de Oaxaca
Amphibians described in 1997
Taxonomy articles created by Polbot